Embrafilme (in full: Empresa Brasileira de Filmes S.A.) was a Brazilian State-owned company created on September 12, 1969 for production, funding and distribution of Brazilian movies. The company was dissolved on March 16, 1990 by the National Privatization Program, launched by the government of President Fernando Collor.

The distribution area is now the responsibility of the private sector.

See also
 Cinema of Brazil

References

External links
 Embrafilme at  IMDb
 Embrafilme creation Law
 Ancine Page
Cinemabrasileiro.net, web about Brazilian cinema

Film production companies of Brazil
Government-owned companies of Brazil
State-owned film companies
Defunct companies of Brazil
1969 establishments in Brazil
1990 disestablishments in Brazil

es:Cine de Brasil
fr:Cinéma brésilien